Strada statale 1 Via Aurelia (SS 1) it is one of the most important state highways in Italy and derives from an ancient consular road, the Via Aurelia. It connects Rome with France following the coast of Tyrrhenian Sea and Ligurian Sea and touching nine provincial capitals as well as important tourist locations.

It constitutes a section of the European route E80 from Tarquinia to Rosignano Marittimo.

References 

001
Transport in Lazio
Transport in Tuscany
Transport in Liguria